Amritsar–Jammu High Speed Rail Corridor is a proposed high-speed rail line connecting Punjab's city, Amritsar with Jammu and Kashmir's winter capital, Jammu. It was one of the six new high-speed rail corridors planned in 2019. The line will be an extension of Delhi–Amritsar line.

This high-speed route will cut short the traveling time from New Delhi to Jammu by ten hours. This line is set to provide economic boost to Jammu as well as improve tourism connectivity for Vaishno Devi pilgrims.

Possible stations

See also
 Chenab Bridge
 Delhi–Amritsar high-speed rail corridor
 High-speed rail in India

References

External links
 NHRCL official website
 Preliminary Study

2020 in rail transport
High-speed railway lines in India
India–Japan relations
Proposed railway lines in India
Rail transport in Delhi
Rail transport in Jammu and Kashmir
Standard gauge railways in India
Transport in Jammu
Transport in Amritsar